"God Did" is a song by American producer DJ Khaled featuring fellow American musicians Rick Ross, Lil Wayne, Jay-Z, John Legend, and Fridayy from the former's thirteenth studio album of the same name (2022). The song earned three nominations at the 65th Annual Grammy Awards for Song of the Year, Best Rap Song and Best Rap Performance.

Background
When DJ Khaled was promoting his album God Did, he publicly thanked Jay-Z for his feature, calling him his idol. Philadelphia producer Fridayy also posted about making the record "in the trenches on a $1000 set up" on Instagram.

Content
"God Did" begins with a spoken intro by DJ Khaled, who addresses the people who did not believe in him. In the first verse, Rick Ross dismisses his haters, hinting that some work for the IRS; then Lil Wayne praises God for making him so influential.

Jay-Z then raps for the next four minutes, detailing his journey from a drug dealer to a successful rapper who has helped build up other Black billionaires, and "dissecting with deceptive complexity the drug war and criminal justice system".

Critical reception
The song was met with a generally positive reception from music critics, many of whom praised Jay-Z's verse in particular.

Writing for AllMusic, Andy Kellman commented, "'God Did" starts off with conventional, half-preening/half-motivational Khaled-speak and standard fare from Rick Ross and Lil Wayne." Regarding Jay-Z's feature, he wrote that he "astounds with an extended verse" and raps "not without showing off a bit, emphasizing his high standing by modifying the title to 'Hov did.'", before adding, "The acuity, wit, and virtuosity command rapt attention."

Paul Attard of Slant Magazine wrote a more critical response toward the song, criticizing Khaled's "maximalist approach" to production: "But never has this rung truer than on 'God Did,' where a spry Jay-Z delivering a mellifluous four-minute verse apparently isn't enough for Khaled. He also tacks on Rick Ross, Lil Wayne, and John Legend, which bloats the track beyond its breaking point, as you feel every last second of its laborious eight-minute-length drag by."

"Hov Did" 
Ari Melber did an in-depth breakdown of Jay-Z's verse on his MSNBC show, drawing positive reactions from Lebron James, who shared Melber's segment on Twitter. Jay-Z broke a Twitter hiatus to respond, and then Jay-Z then released Melber's "acutely detailed dissection" of the verse as a new track, "Hov Did," on streaming music platforms. Jay-Z said Melber did an "amazing job" explaining and reporting on the verse, and making people feel "seen."

Ben Brutocao of HipHopDX wrote that the song "collects 75 percent of a Rick Ross verse, an excellent Lil Wayne verse, and five or six JAY-Z verses into a rain barrel made of three piano keys, an autotuned chorus made in Fridayy's bedroom and a stodgy drumline that gets so bored over the 8-minute runtime that it only deigns to be there for about 60 percent of it."

Dani Blum of Pitchfork had a mostly favorable reaction toward the song, only directing criticism toward the length of the Jay-Z verse: "'God Did' is an eight-and-a-half-minute exercise in bombast: screeching tires, spiraling electric guitar, the back-to-back steamroll of Rick Ross handing off to Lil Wayne handing off to four straight minutes of Jay-Z. Jay's sprawling verse should be its own track—even the joy of hearing him brag about monogrammed pockets and "pushin' Fenty like fentanyl" wears out eventually—but "God Did" is ambitious, the first time since Khaled's early records that he's reached for actual grandness, instead of empty proclamations of it."

Charts

Certifications

References

2022 songs
DJ Khaled songs
Rick Ross songs
Lil Wayne songs
Jay-Z songs
John Legend songs
Songs written by DJ Khaled
Songs written by Rick Ross
Songs written by Lil Wayne
Songs written by Jay-Z
Songs written by John Legend
Song recordings produced by DJ Khaled
Posse cuts